The following is a list of minor fictional characters in the Scottish BBC drama TV series Monarch of the Glen.

Lancelot Fleming 

Lancelot Fleming, played by Simon Slater, comes to Glenbogle on behalf of Lascelles Bank to close the Glenbogle Estate down after their huge debts. But Laird Archie MacDonald has different ideas, he gets housekeeper Lexie McTavish to use her looks and charm to convert Fleming's feelings about Glenbogle. Although Duncan McKay attempted to kill and drown Fleming, Lexie's flirting skills made Fleming give Archie more time to repay the banks debts. He returned later on in the series, and along with Duncan he was devastated to find that Archie shared a bed with Lexie in a train on the way back to Glenbogle from London. They all made up and in the next series Fleming and his fellow bank managers came to Glenbogle and went through a test of physicality. Fleming kissed Lexie and planned to leave his job as a bank manager to pursue his dream of professional piano playing.,
But, as Mary, one of the competitors, revealed her identity as new division manager, Fleming was offered a promotion as her second in the division of Domestic Banking at Lascelles.

Series Details
Series 1 - Episodes 2 and 8
Series 2 - Episode 1

PC Callum McIntyre 

PC Callum McIntyre, played by Gavin Mitchell, is the local police officer for Glenbogle, and the son of Molly MacDonald's brother Jolyon. PC Callum has dealt with Hector MacDonald, Lord Kilwillie and Donald MacDonald many times. He has also arrested Duncan McKay and Molly MacDonald once.

Series Details
Series 3, Episodes 9 and 10.
Series 5, Episodes 2 and 3. 
Series 6, Episodes 2, 5, 6 and 9.
Series 7, Unknown, UNCONFIRMED.

Badger 
Badger, played by Angus Lennie, is Kilwillie's loyal valet. He helps Lord Kilwillie with clothes, baths and meals. Badger is a big supporter of toys in baths such as rubber ducks and rubber army boats. Lady Dorothy dismissed Badger at the end of series five.

Series Details
Series 4, Episodes 1, 2, 7 and 10.
Series 5, Episodes 2 and 3.

Maureen MacLean 
Maureen MacLean, played by Carole Cassidy, is a teacher the Glenbogle School, she was nearly dismissed by headteacher Katrina Finlay when the school was due to be closed down.

Series Details
Series 1, Episodes 1–2.
Series 2, Episodes 4 and 7.

Elizabeth 'Lizzie' MacDonald 
Abigail Cruttenden / Hilary Maclean / Saskia Wickham 
Elizabeth 'Lizzie' MacDonald is the daughter of Hector and Molly MacDonald. She is known in Monarch of the Glen for her rows with her brother Archie MacDonald. She had a daughter in series two, whom she called Martha MacDonald after her father's mother - Martha. In series five she returned to Glenbogle and persuaded Archie to climb a mountain in Nepal with her in honour of their late father. Archie accepted but had to temporarily leave his wife Lexie MacDonald behind.

Family Details
Father - Hector MacDonald
Mother - Molly MacDonald
Brothers - Archie MacDonald, Jamie MacDonald and Paul Bowman-MacDonald (half-brother)
Daughter - Martha MacDonald

Episode Details
Series 1 - Episode 5 (Abigail Cruttenden)
Series 2 - Episode 7 (Hilary Maclean)
Series 5 - Episode 6 (Saskia Wickham)

Martha MacDonald

Martha MacDonald is the young daughter of Lizzie MacDonald. Martha is named after her great-grandmother - Martha.  When at Glenbogle she plays with the ghillie Golly Mackenzie, and the Head Ranger Duncan McKay.  Martha appeared in two episodes - series two, episode seven as a baby and series five, episode six as a toddler.

Family Details 

Mother - Lizzie MacDonald
Grandfather - Hector MacDonald
Grandmother - Molly MacDonald
Uncles - Archie MacDonald, Jamie MacDonald and Paul Bowman (half-uncle)
Aunt - Lexie MacDonald

Jamie MacDonald
James 'Jamie' MacDonald is only ever seen in flashbacks and pictures in the series, and in the flashbacks he is played by an unknown actor. 
Jamie, eldest son of Hector MacDonald and Molly MacDonald, drowned as a teenager. Jamie and his brother Archie were playing with their dog on a boat in the loch when Archie started to rock the boat, the dog fell in and Jamie went in after it. The dog survived, but underwater Jamie got caught in reeds and eventually drowned. The police looked in the loch for six hours for him, and eventually found the dead teenager.

Jamie was seen in flashbacks in Series 1, Episode 3 and Series 4, Episode 4.

Family Details
Father - Hector MacDonald
Mother - Molly MacDonald
Brothers - Archie MacDonald and Paul Bowman (half-brother)
Sister - Lizzie MacDonald
Uncles - Donald MacDonald and Jolyon

Alex Faversham 
Alex Faversham, played by Steven Elder, was Paul Bowman's army officer until Paul left the army. Alex joined the Ministry of Defence, and when a World War II fighter plane was found in the loch at Glenbogle, Alex thought it to be a great idea to take up the mission whilst seeing how Paul was. Alex tries his hardest to stick to the mission, and bets Paul he can find the pilot of the plane before Paul can. Neither of them find him/her until Isobel Anderson's friend Irvine Taylor owns up. Alex quits his job at the MOD, and becomes estate factor at Glenbogle, trying to make everything make traditional, like Laird Paul wearing old clothes, Ewan and Jess respecting the Laird. No-one likes these changes, especially Isobel, who has Alex planning to cut down all the trees on her farm. Isobel and Alex kiss, but Isobel finds out about the trees and leaves him. Alex leaves Glenbogle admitting Paul was always better in the army than him, and that Paul is a natural leader.

Series Details

Series 6, Episodes 4 and 5.

Pamela Morton 
Pamela Morton (née McAlpine), played by Aline Mowat, is the mother of Lexie MacDonald. Pamela has been married several times. First of all to Alec McTavish, with whom she had Lexie, and also Eric Morton, the millionaire she is currently married to. In series two Pamela found out about Archie's new marriage facilities at Glenbogle and eventually married Eric. In series three Pamela returned to Glenbogle for Lexie and Archie's wedding. However Pamela tried taking over the ceremony and Lexie asked her to keep out of it, and things got even worse when Pamela offered to pay the late Hector MacDonald's death duties. Archie accepted the offer making Lexie unhappy, and she ran away. But in the end (after a car/bus chase) Archie and Lexie decided to stay together. Pamela has not appeared since.

Series Details
Series 2, Episode 6.
Series 3, Episode 11.

Harold Xavier 

Harold is a good friend of Hector and Molly MacDonald. When Harold visited Glenbogle to do some work on his family tree, it was revealed that 'H' at the Big House was the father of local school headteacher Katrina Finlay, it was presumed that Hector was the father of Katrina. But all was revealed when the Laird Archie MacDonald visited an island with Katrina, and Harold revealed he was the father of Katrina. Katrina decided she didn't need another father, so she decided that Harold could be her uncle.

Fergal MacClure 

Fergal MacClure, played by Jason O'Mara, beats off competition from Golly Mackenzie and Duncan McKay for the head ranger job, and beats Archie MacDonald to the heart of Katrina Finlay. At the end of the series, Fergal got a job in New Zealand, and Katrina decided to go with him. But on the train to Edinburgh, Katrina got off the train and ran back to Glenbogle, breaking Fergal's heart. Fergal ran back to Glenbogle to try and sort things out with Katrina, but he could not find her. Even without Katrina, Fergal wanted the job in New Zealand, and carried on his journey.

Series details 

Series 2: episodes 2-7

Jackie MacIntyre

Played by Robert Fyfe, his only appearance in Monarch of the Glen was in series six, episode six. Jackie is an elderly good friend of Donald MacDonald and used to be part of Donald's car crew when they were young. Jackie came to Glenbogle in series six for his stag-do, but realises he is too old. Jackie, Donald and nineteen-year-old chef Ewan Brodie go to party at the Ghillie's Rest, but get a bit bored and end up at dancing at Meg Paterson's dancing class! Jackie started to torment Donald about not having a girlfriend or wife, and the fact that it was Donald who was the famous one, and that he wasn't a very good driver anyway. Ewan sorted Jackie out, and they all became friends again. Jackie left Glenbogle a married man.

Zoë
Zoë is a fictional character in the Scottish BBC drama TV Series Monarch of the Glen. Zoë is played by Scottish actress Kari Corbett.

Zoë is the barmaid at The Ghillie's Rest - a pub in Glenbogle. Local lad Ewan Brodie took a fancy to Zoë before the karaoke evening at the Ghillie's Rest and she took a fancy back!

Alan Smythe 

Alan Smythe is a fictional character in the BBC TV series Monarch of the Glen. Alan is played by Scottish actor Paul Goodwin.

Alan arrives at ex-girlfriend Katrina Finlay's house in order to win back her heart, but she has already taken a fancy to Laird Archie MacDonald. Alan took care of Katrina's case about her father - 'H'. But he became too formal and Katrina dealt with the matter herself. In order to ruin her chances with Archie, Alan ruins the annual Glenbogle Ball. However, after this Katrina chucks Alan out. Alan returned to Glenbogle and helped Katrina with her local election campaign, and whilst in a drunken state he proposed to her.

Series details
Series 1, Episodes 3–4, 7-8

Catriona

Catriona is a fictional character in the TV series Monarch of the Glen. Catriona is played by Ruth Millar. Catriona come to Glenbogle in order to take Glenbogle off the hands of Paul Bowman-MacDonald and Molly MacDonald, in order to have it for her astronaut husband and herself.

Series details

Series 7: unknown episodes

Monarch of the Glen characters
Monarch of the Glen